is a traditional Japanese broth, steamed and served in a dobin tea pot with shrimp, chicken, soy sauce, lime, and matsutake mushroom.

See also

References 

Japanese cuisine